Kayalıköy can refer to:

 Kayalıköy Dam
 Kayalıköy, Karamanlı